Maiden's Blush can refer to:

 Cyclophora punctaria, a moth species
 The Maiden Blush apple cultivar
 The Hawthornden apple cultivar (incorrectly)
 Euroschinus falcatus, a tree of eastern Australia
 Rosa 'Great Maiden's Blush', a rose
 Sloanea australis, a rainforest tree of eastern Australia